Dashti-ye Esmail Khani (also Romanized as Dashtī-ye Esmā‘īl Khānī) is a village in Dashti-ye Esmail Khani Rural District of Ab Pakhsh District, Dashtestan County, Bushehr province, Iran. At the 2006 census, its population was 769 in 172 households, when it was a village in Darvahi Rural District of Shabankareh District. The following census in 2011 counted 671 people in 158 households, by which time the rural district had been established as a part of Ab Pakhsh District. The latest census in 2016 showed a population of 546 people in 155 households; it was the largest village in its rural district.

References 

Populated places in Dashtestan County